Milles Nunatak is a nunatak lying  northeast of Howell Peak on the north end of the Daniels Range, in the Usarp Mountains of Victoria Land in West Antarctica. Milles Nunatak was mapped by the United States Geological Survey from surveys and U.S. Navy aerial photographs, 1960–62, and was named by the Advisory Committee on Antarctic Names for David Bruce Milles, a U.S. Antarctic Research Program (USARP) biological laboratory manager at McMurdo Station in 1967–68. Milles was a student in the Department of Geology and Geophysics at the University of Minnesota, and was employed under a National Science Foundation contract to maintain and manage the USARP's Earth Science and Biology laboratories at McMurdo Station.

References

Nunataks of Victoria Land
Pennell Coast